"Soldiers of Misfortune" is the lead single from Filter's fourth studio album, Anthems for the Damned. It premiered on Myspace on February 25, 2008 and was released to radio stations on March 18, 2008. "Soldiers of Misfortune" was added to Amazon MP3 and iTunes on April 29, 2008.

The song is described by singer Richard Patrick as a "sardonic anti-war/pro-troops song." Its first-person narrative was inspired by a letter from Sgt. Justin L. Eyerly, a Filter fan who had enlisted in the Army National Guard to get his college tuition paid; in his final year of college, he was shipped off to Iraq where he died from an improvised explosive device attack after only two months of duty.

Music video
The video for the song features the band performing while shots of soldiers and war are shown, as well as plastic soldiers shooting each other.

Charts

References

2008 singles
Filter (band) songs
Songs of the Iraq War
Songs about the military
Songs about soldiers
Anti-war songs
Songs based on actual events
Songs written by Richard Patrick
2008 songs
Song recordings produced by Josh Abraham
Rock ballads
Fontana Records singles